In the 2010–11 season, MC Alger competed in the Ligue 1 for the 40th season, as well as the Champions League, and the Algerian Cup. It was their 8th consecutive season in the top flight of Algerian football.

Squad list
Players and squad numbers last updated on 18 November 2010.Note: Flags indicate national team as has been defined under FIFA eligibility rules. Players may hold more than one non-FIFA nationality.

Competitions

Overview

{| class="wikitable" style="text-align: center"
|-
!rowspan=2|Competition
!colspan=8|Record
!rowspan=2|Started round
!rowspan=2|Final position / round
!rowspan=2|First match	
!rowspan=2|Last match
|-
!
!
!
!
!
!
!
!
|-
| Ligue 1

|  
| 10th
| 25 September 2010
| 8 July 2011
|-
| Algerian Cup

| Round of 64 
| Quarter-final
| 28 December 2010
| 8 April 2011
|-
| Champions League

| Preliminary round 
| Second round
| 30 January 2011
| 7 May 2011
|-
! Total

Ligue 1

League table

Results summary

Results by round

Matches

Algerian Cup

Champions League

Preliminary round

First round

Second round

Squad information

Playing statistics

|-

|-
! colspan=12 style=background:#dcdcdc; text-align:center| Players transferred out during the season

Goalscorers

Transfers

In

Out

References

External links

MC Alger seasons
MC Alger